The Celadon is a mythological river of Arcadia crossed by Heracles in pursuit of the Hind of Ceryneia, according to Pindar: it is mentioned by Strabo.  Pausanias names it the Celadus and states that it is a tributary of the Alpheus.   

In Homer's Iliad it is described as being under the walls of Pheia, not far from the river Iardanus, on the borders of Pylos: Ereuthalion was killed by Nestor here.

References

 
 
 

Mythological rivers